Liquorilactobacillus is a genus of lactic acid bacteria.

Species
The genus  comprises the following species:
 Liquorilactobacillus aquaticus (Mañes-Lázaro et al. 2009) Zheng et al. 2020
 Liquorilactobacillus cacaonum (De Bruyne et al. 2009) Zheng et al. 2020
 Liquorilactobacillus capillatus (Chao et al. 2008) Zheng et al. 2020
 Liquorilactobacillus ghanensis (Nielsen et al. 2007) Zheng et al. 2020
 Liquorilactobacillus hordei (Rouse et al. 2008) Zheng et al. 2020
 Liquorilactobacillus mali (Carr and Davies 1970) Zheng et al. 2020
 Liquorilactobacillus nagelii (Edwards et al. 2000) Zheng et al. 2020
 Liquorilactobacillus oeni (Mañes-Lázaro et al. 2009) Zheng et al. 2020
 Liquorilactobacillus satsumensis (Endo and Okada 2005) Zheng et al. 2020
 Liquorilactobacillus sicerae (Puertas et al. 2014) Zheng et al. 2020
 Liquorilactobacillus sucicola (Irisawa and Okada 2009) Zheng et al. 2020
 Liquorilactobacillus uvarum (Mañes-Lázaro et al. 2009) Zheng et al. 2020
 Liquorilactobacillus vini (Rodas et al. 2006) Zheng et al. 2020

Phylogeny
The currently accepted taxonomy is based on the List of Prokaryotic names with Standing in Nomenclature and the phylogeny is based on whole-genome sequences.

References

Lactobacillaceae
Bacteria genera